IT-backed authoritarianism, also known as techno-authoritarianism, digital authoritarianism or digital dictatorship, refers to the state use of information technology in order to control or manipulate both foreign and domestic populations. Tactics of digital authoritarianism may include mass surveillance including through biometrics such as facial recognition, internet firewalls and censorship, internet blackouts,  disinformation campaigns, and digital social credit systems. Although some institutions assert that this term should only be used to refer to authoritarian governments, others argue that the tools of digital authoritarianism are being adopted and implemented by governments with "authoritarian tendencies", including democracies.

Definition 
IT-backed authoritarianism refers to an authoritarian regime using cutting-edge information technology in order to penetrate, control and shape the behavior of actors within society and the economy. The basis is an advanced, all-encompassing and in large parts real-time surveillance system, which merges government-run systems and data bases (e.g. traffic monitoring, financial credit rating, education system, health sector etc.) with company surveillance systems (e.g. of shopping preferences, activities on social media platforms etc.). 
IT-backed authoritarianism institutionalizes the data transfer between companies and governmental agencies providing the government with full and regular access to data collected by companies. The authoritarian government remains the only entity with unlimited access to the collected data. IT-backed authoritarianism thus increases the authority of the regime vis-à-vis national and multinational companies as well as vis-à-vis other decentral or subnational political forces and interest groups.
The collected data is utilized by the authoritarian regime to analyze and influence the behavior of a country’s citizens, companies and other institutions. It does so with the help of algorithms based on the principles and norms of the authoritarian regime, automatically calculating credit scores for every individual and institution. In contrast to financial credit ratings, these “social credit scores” are based on the full range of collected surveillance data, including financial as well as non-financial information.
IT-backed authoritarianism only allows full participation in a country’s economy and society for those who have a good credit scoring and thus respect the rules and norms of the respective authoritarian regime. Behavior deviating from these norms incurs automatic punishment through a bad credit scoring, which leads to economic or social disadvantages (loan conditions, lower job opportunities, no participation in public procurement etc.). Severe violation or non-compliance can lead to the exclusion from any economic activities on the respective market or (for individuals) to an exclusion from public services.

Examples

China 

China is a pioneer and leading example for an IT-backed authoritarianism.  Since 2014 the country is building up respective structures under the catch-phrase Social Credit System (社会信用体系). Private internet companies like Baidu, Alibaba and Tencent support the Chinese government’s ambitions for an IT-backed authoritarian regime with their technologies in the field of IT systems and data analytics. Between 2014 and 2016, the Chinese government published more than 40 political plans detailing the envisioned system.

Russia 

The Russian model of digital authoritarianism relies on strict laws of digital expression and the technology to enforce them. Since 2012, as part of a broader crackdown on civil society, the Russian Parliament has adopted numerous laws curtailing speech and expression. Hallmarks of Russian digital authoritarianism include:

 The surveillance of all internet traffic through the System for Operative Investigative Activities (SORM) and the Semantic Archive;
 Restrictive laws on the freedom of speech and expression, including the blacklisting of hundreds of thousands of sites, and punishment including fines and jail time for activities including slander, "insulting religious feelings," and "acts of extremism".
 Infrastructure regulations including requirements for Internet Service Providers (ISPs) to install Deep Packet Inspection equipment under the 2019 Sovereign Internet Law.

References 

Authoritarianism
Mass surveillance
Government by algorithm